Sergey Ryabev (born 10 July 1951) is a Soviet speed skater. He competed in the men's 1500 metres event at the 1976 Winter Olympics.

References

External links
 

1951 births
Living people
Soviet male speed skaters
Olympic speed skaters of the Soviet Union
Speed skaters at the 1976 Winter Olympics
Place of birth missing (living people)